The 8th Vietnam Film Festival was held from March 15 to March 22, 1988, in Danang, Vietnam, with the slogan "For the creation of art and perfection of the new socialist people. For the development of the national cinema" (Vietnamese: "Vì sự sáng tạo nghệ thuật và hoàn thiện con người mới xã hội chủ nghĩa. Vì sự phát triển của nền điện ảnh dân tộc").

Event 
At this film festival, there are many typical faces of artists, many artistic styles are shown on a rich and massive work scale, which can be said to be unprecedented up to that time. A total of 146 films participated in the Film Festival: 17 feature films, 52 documentary/ science films, 22 animated films, and 12 children films were brought to the competition.

This is the most exciting film festival with the enthusiastic response of the public. It is the first film festival in the country's Renovated Era with a wide variety of films, reflecting the core issues of society. In the end, 6 Golden Lotuses were awarded equally for each category of feature film, documentary/science film, children/animated film.

The film "Cô gái trên sông" was given enough marks by the judges to win the Golden Lotus award, but then people spread the news that the film was banned, so it dropped to the Silver Lotus award. Later, when the delegations returned from Da Nang and passed through Hue, seeing this film being shown everywhere, it turned out that there was no ban at all.

Awards

Feature film

Documentary/Science film

Documentary

Science

Children/Animated film

References 

Vietnam Film Festival
Vietnam Film Festival
1988 in Vietnam